Flow-mediated dilation (FMD) refers to dilation (widening) of an artery when blood flow increases in that artery. The primary cause of FMD is release of nitric oxide by endothelial cells.

To determine FMD, brachial artery dilation following a transient period of forearm ischemia is measured using ultrasound.  Because the value of FMD can be compromised when improperly applied, attempts have been made to standardize the methodology for measuring FMD.

Clinical significance
FMD is a noninvasive measure of blood vessel health (endothelial dysfunction) which (when low) is at least as predictive of cardiovascular disease as traditional risk factors. Major cardiovascular disease associated with low FMD include cardiac death, myocardial infarction, and stroke.

Low FMD is a stronger predictor of future cardiovascular disease events in patients with existing cardiovascular disease than in healthy normal persons.

FMD is a sensitive marker for the amount of blood vessel damage caused by cigarette smoke. So-called light cigarettes (having reduced tar and nicotine) were shown to impair FMD as much as regular cigarettes.

Improved FMD results in greater perfusion and oxygen supply to peripheral tissue.

An Israeli study of 618 healthy subjects found FMD to be an excellent predictor of long-term adverse cardiovascular  events. Participants with below-mean FMD were 278% more likely to experience cardiovascular events during the 4.6 year average follow-up period than participant with above-mean FMD (95% Confidence Interval: 135-571%, p-value<0.001).

The clinical value of FMD is limited by the fact that FMD is difficult to measure, requiring a skilled and well-trained clinician.

Effects of exercise
A study of healthy young men who normally take over 10,000 steps per day, but were restricted to less than 5,000 steps per day for five days showed impaired FMD in the popliteal (leg) artery, but not the brachial (arm) artery. The reduction of leg FMD caused by prolonged sitting can be reduced by fidgeting (periodic leg movement).

An eight-week program of brisk walking resulted in a 50% increase in brachial artery FMD in middle-aged and older men, but failed to produce this benefit in estrogen-deficient post-menopausal women.

Forty-five minutes of cycling exercise before sitting has been shown to eliminate the impaired leg FMD due to three hours of sitting. Athletes over age 40 show greater FMD than their age-matched peers.

A meta-analysis of 182 subjects showed twice the improvement in FMD resulting from high-intensity interval training compared to endurance training.

See also
 Atherosclerosis
 Hypercholesterolemia

References

Medical diagnosis
Cardiovascular diseases